Stadium station is an Edmonton Light Rail Transit station in Edmonton, Alberta, Canada. It serves the Capital Line. It is a ground-level station located at 111 Avenue and 84 Street, next to Commonwealth Stadium and Clarke Stadium.

History
The station opened on April 22, 1978, and is one of the original five stations on the LRT system.

Redevelopment work on the station began in mid-May 2020. The station redevelopment includes renovating the entire station roof canopy, removing the underground concourse, adding a second platform (making the station the only two platform LRT station in Edmonton), adding new heated shelters, public washrooms, and a security office. This redevelopment work is expected to be complete in January 2022.

Station layout
The station has a 125 metre long centre loading platform that can accommodate two five-car LRT trains at the same time, with one train on each side of the platform.  The platform is just under eight metres wide, which is narrow by current Edmonton LRT design guidelines. 468 parking spaces are available to commuters at the station.

Public art
The public art at Stadium station was designed by students at the University of Alberta. It is a series of flags and flagpoles made of coloured aluminum.

Security
In 2010, a 23-year-old woman was shot and killed at Stadium station.

Around the station
Commonwealth Stadium
Clarke Stadium
Cromdale, Edmonton
McCauley, Edmonton 
Norwood, Edmonton

Stadium Transit Centre

The Stadium Transit Centre is located on the east and west side of the LRT station (along 111 avenue). It is connected to the station by a pedestrian underpass below the station. This transit centre has park & ride and a drop off area. There are no public washrooms, pay phones, or vending machines at this transit centre.

The following bus routes serve the transit centre:

The above list does not include LRT services from the adjacent LRT station.

References

See also

Edmonton Light Rail Transit stations
Railway stations in Canada opened in 1978
Edmonton Transit Service transit centres
Capital Line